Jiaozuo railway station is a station on Xinxiang–Yueshan railway and Zhengzhou–Jiaozuo intercity railway in Jiaozuo, Henan.

History
The station was established in 1965.

In 2015, the station was connected with Zhengzhou–Jiaozuo intercity railway. As an auxiliary project, the south station building and south plaza commenced construction in 2016, and was put into use on 1 July 2018.

Station Layout

References

Railway stations in Henan
Stations on the Zhengzhou–Jiaozuo intercity railway
Railway stations in China opened in 1965